The Zichy Mansion is an eclectic style manor house designed by János Zichy situated on 28 hectares in Zichyújfalu, Hungary. It dates from the 1800s, and belonged to the Zichy family.

Gallery

References

See also 
List of castles in Hungary

Mansions in Hungary
Palaces in Hungary
Castles in Hungary
Buildings and structures in Fejér County
Zichy family